The FM104 PhoneShow was a late night phone-in programme on the Dublin radio station FM104 hosted by Keith Ward. It aired Monday to Thursday evenings from 21:00 to 01:00 and from 22:00 to 00:00 on Friday nights. Live images from the studio were simulcast on local cable TV station City Channel, until the TV station closed in September

Get It Off Your Chest
A typical programme begins with a 90-minute segment called Get It Off Your Chest, a less serious show in which callers are invited to call the station to discuss whatever they want. This section includes phone, text-in competitions and callers to the show randomly winning small prizes.

Main Issues
Listeners are invited to submit topics by email and telephone for discussion on the programme between 22:30 and 00:30 nightly. These topics usually relate to issues affecting Dubliners, current affairs and listeners' personal problems.

Chris Barry
Chris Barry, who originally started the FM104 Phoneshow in 1990, took over the show on 30 September 2013 after Adrian Kennedy and co-presenter/producer Jeremy Dixon left the station.

Phone Show Extra
Phone Show Extra is broadcast between 00:30 and 01:00. It consists of previously broadcast material from the show over the years.

Breaking News
FM104 was the first Irish broadcaster to break the news of the death of Michael Jackson. The news was broken during the FM104 PhoneShow. Local celebrities including Westlife singer Nicky Byrne expressed their sadness on the phone show. They also had an interview with a Los-Angeles based journalist followed by a half-hour of Michael Jackson's music.

Adrian & Jeremy
Adrian Kennedy began hosting the show in 1997, he was later joined by Jeremy Dixon. In September 2013 it was announced that Adrian & Jeremy were to leave FM104 to take up a new position presenting a daytime show on 98FM in 2014.  The two stated "16 years is long enough for anybody to work nights" as their reason for leaving.

Keith Ward and John Berrill
Keith Ward of 98FM and John Berrill of Spin 1038 took over the show in January 2017 under the same show name. As well as broadcasting online, the show now focuses on new streams such as Facebook Live where they preview topics coming up.

Keith Ward departed the station in 2019, who was later replaced by Cormac Moore for a short stint. It was then announced that The Phoneshow would rebrand.

See also
 FM104
 The Strawberry Alarm Clock

External links
 FM104 PhoneShow Page
 FM104

References 

 

Irish talk radio shows